Johanna Jantina "Hanneke" van der Werf (born 29 November 1984) is a Dutch politician of the Democrats 66 (D66). She has been a member of the House of Representatives since the 2021 general election. She previously held a seat in the municipal council of The Hague (2014–2021) and worked for the D66 caucus in the House of Representatives (2010–2018).

Early life and career 
Van der Werf was born in Hengelo, Overijssel. She lived in nearby Haaksbergen until she was two years old, when her family moved to the village of Rekken. She attended secondary school Het Assink in Haaksbergen and subsequently studied history and journalism at the University of Groningen. From 2008 to 2009, Van der Werf worked as an editor of Den Haag Vandaag at the political news department of NOS, after which she worked as a personal assistant to a member of parliament. Between 2010 and 2018, she worked as a press officer for the D66 caucus in the House of Representatives. She had joined the party in the former year.

Municipal councillor 
Van der Werf ran as a candidate in the 2014 municipal election in The Hague, appearing seventh on D66's party list. She did not win a seat, as two candidates lower on the list were elected with preferential votes. She received a temporary seat in April 2014, when one of D66's council members went on sick leave. 

Her membership became permanent in June 2014, when another councillor left to become an alderwoman. She was voted chair of the presidium three years later. In 2017, the municipal executive approved a bill she had presented that introduced a six-and-a-half-week paid paternity leave for civil servants. Before, fathers could only take a thirteen-week half-paid parental leave.

Van der Werf was re-elected in 2018 as the second candidate on the party list. Her specialization within her party was security and integration. She succeeded Robert van Asten as D66 caucus leader in The Hague in June 2018, when Van Asten became an alderman in the new executive. In September 2018, Van der Werf stopped working for the D66 caucus in the House of Representatives to take a job at financial services company Aegon as a spokesperson for mortgages, damage and innovation. 

As council member, she wanted The Hague to apply for a pilot to test the legal cultivation and distribution of cannabis, but it was not supported by enough parties. She also called for the municipality to do more to prevent female circumcisions. In 2019, the council passed a proposal by Van der Werf to investigate businesses for criminal activities in specific areas. The approach had already been tried in Amsterdam.

House of Representatives 
In 2020, it was announced that Van der Werf would run in the 2021 general election. She was the ninth candidate on the party list, six places below her initial third place on the draft version of the list. She was elected, receiving 13,935 preferential votes, and was sworn into the House of Representatives on 31 March. Van der Werf vacated her seat in The Hague council in April. In the House, her specializations are security, terrorism, and sex crimes (formerly also drugs, asylum, prostitution, human trafficking, and migration), and she is on the Committees for Digital Affairs, for the Interior, and for Justice and Security as well as on Europol's Joint Parliamentary Scrutiny Group.

In November 2021, she pled for a central point to aid victims of sexual violence and child abuse. A motion led to an investigation into establishing such a point. Van der Werf was appointed national campaign leader of D66 in May 2022 ahead of the 2023 provincial elections.

Personal life 
While a member of the House of Representatives, Van der Werf moved from The Hague to Voorburg. She married in 2022 in Rekken, five and a half years after the start of the relationship, and her husband is part of a band called Weekend Warriors. Their daughter was born in 2020.

References 

1984 births
21st-century Dutch politicians
21st-century Dutch women politicians
Democrats 66 politicians
Dutch campaign managers
Living people
Members of the House of Representatives (Netherlands)
Municipal councillors of The Hague
Political staffers
University of Groningen alumni
Political spokespersons